Nevin 'Sticky' Torrens is a British former motor racing driver and greyhound trainer.  He was one of the first hot rod racers from Northern Ireland.

Torrens was born in Ballymoney in County Antrim, He moved into hot rod racing after a brief time in Superstox.

Torrens initially campaigned mk1 and mk2 Ford Escorts and then switched to a Hillman Avenger (which he had previously rallied).  In 1978, he became the first driver to race a non-hybrid Talbot Sunbeam.  After racing the Talbot for several seasons, Torrens built and raced a Toyota Starlet.  When building the Starlet, he used Toyota power rather than making a hybrid Ford-powered version.

In 1976 Torrens was one of the first drivers to represent Northern Ireland in the National and British Championship meetings at Hednesford and Arlington respectively. He also raced at Cowdenbeath in Scotland.

Torren's first racing number was 411, which appeared on his mk1 Escort. In 1977 the Irish promoters decided to switch to race numbers with only two digits and he changed his competition number to 88.  As well as having a change of number Torrens changed his racing livery from white and orange to a distinctive zebra striped one. In 1979 a national hot rod numbering system was introduced with Northern Ireland's drivers being allocated 900–999, Torrens taking 988.

Major Titles Won
1975 Hot Rod Irish Championship 
1976 Hot Rod Irish Open Championship 
1976 Hot Rod Irish Championship 
1977 World Barbering Cup 
1981 Mr Northern Ireland

References

British racing drivers
Living people
Year of birth missing (living people)